Bromfield may refer to:

People
 Bromfield (surname)

Places
 Bromfield, Cumbria
 Bromfield, Shropshire

Other uses
 The Bromfield School in Harvard, Massachusetts